Dominia may refer to:

 Dominia (band), a Russian melodic death metal band
 Dominia, one of the cable-laying ships that produced the All Red Line
 The original name for the Multiverse, the fictional universe of Magic: The Gathering

See also
 Domina (disambiguation)
 Dominica, an island country in the Caribbean